Buchi Lami is a small village located in Padwa block of Palamu district, Jharkhand state, India. According to census (2011), The Buchi Lami village has population of 886 of which 443 are males while 443 are females.

History 

Buchi Lami a village, close to Padwa block of Palamu, is located 25 km from Medininagar (Daltonganj). Buchi Lami is a part of Chhatarpur  (Vidhan Sabha constituency). It is located in north of Daltonganj. As per constitution of India and Panchyati Raaj Act, Buchi Lami village is administrated by Sarpanch (Head of Village) who is elected representative of village.

Languages 

Languages spoken here include Asuri, an Austroasiatic language spoken by approximately 17 000 in India, largely in the southern part of Palamu; and Bhojpuri, a tongue in the Bihari language group with almost 40 000 000 speakers, written in both the Devanagari and Kaithi scripts.

Facilities

Education 

 RK High School Lami Patra
 Middle school Buchi Lami

See also

 Chhatarpur Assembly
 Palamu Loksabha constituency
 Jharkhand Legislative Assembly
 Jharkhand
 Palamu

References

External links 
 Population Census Result 2011
 Blocks of Palamu district
 Pandwa block details
 Details of Buchi Lami in census 2011
 Information about Buchi Lami
 Padwa Block

Villages in Palamu district